Matt Yuri Fernández López (born 10 August 1957) is a Chilean football manager.

He has been five-times coach of Universidad de Concepción. He’s married and has four children.

References

External links
 Yuri Fernández at Memoria Wanderers (in Spanish)

1957 births
Living people
People from Chillán
Chilean footballers
C.D. Huachipato footballers
Primera B de Chile players
Chilean football managers
Huachipato managers
Universidad de Concepción managers
Santiago Wanderers managers
Rangers de Talca managers
Chilean Primera División managers
Primera B de Chile managers
Segunda División Profesional de Chile managers